The 2012 season saw Lillestrøm compete in the Tippeligaen as well as the 2012 Norwegian Football Cup. They finished the season in 9th in the Tippeligaen and they were knocked out of in the Fourth Round by Bodø/Glimt. It was the club's first season with Magnus Haglund as their manager.

Squad

Out on loan

Transfers

Winter

In:

Out:

Summer

In:

Out:

Competitions

Pre-season

Tippeligaen

Results summary

Results by round

Results

Table

Norwegian Cup

Squad statistics

Appearances and goals

|-
|colspan="14"|Players away ftom Lillestrøm on loan:

|-
|colspan="14"|Players who appeared for Lillestrøm no longer at the club:

|}

Goal scorers

Disciplinary record

References 

Lillestrøm SK seasons
Lillestrom SK